Doyle v. Mitchell Bros. Co., 247 U.S. 179 (1918), was a United States Supreme Court case defining gross income.  The case held that gross income includes the gain on sale of assets, i.e., the proceeds less cost basis.  An alternative theory that gross income should be the gross proceeds, and the cost basis should be allowed as a deduction, was rejected by the Court. The Court also held that the harvesting of timber was not an income recognition event until the timber was sold.

Background
In 1909, Congress enacted a tax on net income of corporations.  Much of the language defining gross income in that law has been retained in current tax law.  Thus, court decisions interpreting the meaning of that law may have continuing relevance.

Mitchell Bros. was a timber producer organized in 1903.  Upon passage of the predecessor to current income tax law, the company became subject to tax on net income.  Mitchell Bros. held various timber lands from which it harvested timber.  After harvesting, the timber and land would be sold separately.  The Court addressed questions of when income from timber was to be included in taxable income and how taxable income from sale of the land was to be calculated.

Opinion of the Court
On the gross income question, the Court stated in paragraph 13, "In order to determine whether there has been gain or loss, and the amount of the gain if any, we must withdraw from the gross proceeds an amount sufficient to restore the capital value that existed at the commencement of the period under consideration."

On the timing question, the Court found, in paragraph 17, that the mere harvesting of timber did not give rise to income.  The Court held that income from the timber should be recognized when the timber was sold.

External links
 

United States Supreme Court cases
1918 in United States case law
United States taxation and revenue case law
United States Supreme Court cases of the White Court